Fry's Turkish Delight is a chocolate bar made by Cadbury. It was launched in the UK in 1914 by the Bristol-based chocolate manufacturer J. S. Fry & Sons and consists of a rose-flavoured Turkish delight surrounded by milk chocolate. The Fry's identity remained in use after Fry & Sons merged with Cadbury in 1919.

In Australia and New Zealand, the range of "Turkish" products released by Cadbury has expanded to include mini-Easter eggs, ice cream, sectioned family block chocolate bars, and small versions used in boxed chocolates. In Ireland, Cadbury also manufacture the Dairy Milk Turkish, using Cadburys Dairy Milk chocolate instead with a slightly different Turkish centre, in the familiar block bar form.

As of August 2010, production of Fry's Turkish Delight (along with other products such as Fry's Chocolate Cream, Crunchie etc.) for the UK market is based in Poland. They also now contain no artificial colours (changed from E129 Allura Red AC to natural E160a carotenes and E162 Beetroot Red.) In New Zealand they are still made with artificial colours.

From the late 1950s the slogan 'Full of Eastern Promise' has been used for the product on British TV advertisements. Among those appearing in such advertisements in the 1960s were the model and actress Jane Lumb. In 2000, ‘Eastern Promise’ was ranked 37th in Channel 4’s poll of the "100 Greatest Adverts".

See also
 List of chocolate bar brands

References

External links
 

British confectionery
Chocolate bars
Cadbury brands
Products introduced in 1914
Mondelez International brands